Søren Fjordback Søndergaard (born 17 September 1966 in Nørager, Nordjylland) is a Danish former professional boxer. As an Amateur he won the bronze medal at the 1987 European Championships in Turin, Italy in the Men's Light Welterweight (– 63.5 kg) division. Nicknamed Mr. Perfect he represented his native country at the 1988 Summer Olympics in Seoul, South Korea, losing in the first round to eventual gold medalist Vyacheslav Yanovskiy.

1988 Olympic results
Below is the record of Soren Sondergaard, a Danish Light welterweight boxer who competed at the 1988 Seoul Olympics:

 Round of 64: lost to Vyacheslav Yanovskiy (Soviet Union) referee stopped contest in the second round

Professional career
During his professional career he held the European Super Lightweight Title and the International Boxing Council Super Lightweight and Welterweight Titles. He recorded victories over world champions Michele Piccirillo, Livingstone Bramble and Carlos Baldomir, his only professional loss coming in a European title fight with future WBA World Super-Lightweight champion Khalid Rahilou.

References
sports-reference

1966 births
Living people
Light-welterweight boxers
Boxers at the 1988 Summer Olympics
Olympic boxers of Denmark
Danish male boxers
People from Rebild Municipality
Sportspeople from the North Jutland Region